Guardalavaca Airport  is an airport serving the town of Guardalavaca in the Holguín Province of Cuba.

The runway of deteriorated asphalt has significant grass encroachment.

See also

Transport in Cuba
List of airports in Cuba

References

External links
 OpenStreetMap - Guardalavaca
 Skyvector - Guardalavaca

Airports in Cuba
Banes, Cuba